This article lists political parties in Kenya.

Political culture 
Kenya's system is one with characteristics comparable with a two-party system, since two dominant political parties c.q. coalitions have dominated since the last general elections in 2007. However, it has been a multi-party system since 1992 and one of the ruling coalitions consists of several parties.
Kenya had over 160 registered political parties as of November 2007.

Following the implementation of several Political Parties Acts starting with the 31 December 2008 act, the number of political parties has been coming down considerably since. With the lapse of the registration period set out in the political parties act on 30 April 2012, twenty-four political parties had gained registration certificates while 22 others had applied for registration.

The parties

Parliamentary parties

Other parties

Former parties

See also
 Politics of Kenya
 List of political parties by country

References

External links 
Independent Electoral and Boundaries Commission
 The Registrar of Political Parties
 How to join a political party in Kenya
 Funding for political parties in Kenya

Kenya
 
Political parties
Political parties
Kenya